Bruno Hildebrand (6 March 1812 – 29 January 1878) was a German economist representing the "older" historical school of economics. His economic thinking was highly critical of classical economists, especially of David Ricardo. His magnum opus was Economics of the Present and the Future (1848).  The basic aim of this work was to establish laws of economic development. Hildebrand also stated that economic development was linear not cyclical. He supported socialist theory on the basis of religion, basic morals, and his beliefs of the negative effect of property on economic behavior.

Like many other representatives of the German Historical School such as Friedrich List, Karl Knies, and Karl Bücher, Hildebrand was a political liberal who advocated liberal institutions and a constitutional state, and participated in the Frankfurt Parliament of 1848. An economics professor in Marburg, he was accused of high treason with respect to the turmoil of 1848 and condemned to death.  He avoided the execution of this sentence by escaping to Switzerland, where he served as an associate professor at the University of Zurich. Together with Alfred Escher he was a co-founder and CEO of the Swiss Northeastern Railway and also was the founder of the Swiss National Bureau Federal Statistical Office. Hildebrand also created and directed the publication 'Jahrbücher für Nationalökonomie und Statistik';  for his contributions he was granted honorary Swiss citizenship. He became a professor at the University of Bern. Hildebrand returned then to Germany, where he was a professor at the University of Jena.

His son was the artist and sculptor Adolf von Hildebrand. His grandson was the Catholic philosopher Dietrich von Hildebrand. His great-great-grandson is environmental leader Martin von Hildebrand.

References

Further reading
 
Dictionnaire historique de la Suisse: sciences écconomiques
http://www.hls-dhs-dss.ch/textes/f/F8263.php

External links
Hildebrand, Bruno at Encyclopedia
Bruno Hildebrand at Allgemeine Deutsche Biographie

1812 births
1878 deaths
People from Naumburg (Saale)
People from the Kingdom of Saxony
German economists
Bruno
Members of the Frankfurt Parliament
Leipzig University alumni
University of Breslau alumni
Academic staff of the University of Breslau
Academic staff of the University of Marburg
Academic staff of the University of Zurich
Academic staff of the University of Bern
Academic staff of the University of Jena
Historical school economists